A Witch Without a Broom is a 1967 Spanish film starring Jeffrey Hunter. It was directed by José María Elorrieta.

Cast

External links

A Witch Without a Broom at TCMDB

1967 films
Spanish fantasy comedy films
1960s Spanish-language films
Films produced by Sidney W. Pink
Films directed by José María Elorrieta
Films shot in Madrid
1960s Spanish films
1960s fantasy comedy films